Shri Shivabalayogi Maharaj (24 January 1935 – 28 March 1994) is a yogi who claimed to have attained self-realization through twelve years of arduous tapas, meditating in samādhi (state of total absorption) for an average of twenty hours a day.

After he completed tapas, he was given the name Shivabalayogi, which means "Yogi devoted to Shiva and Parvati." In Hinduism, Shiva is God in the form of a yogi. Bala (Sanskrit: child) is one of the many names for Parvati, God in the form of a yogini. The name reflects that Shivabalayogi is a manifestation of both the male and female aspects of the divine (Ardhanarishwara). Generally, devotees called him simply "Swamiji" meaning "respected Master".

For three decades he traveled extensively in India and Sri Lanka, initiating over ten million people into dhyana meditation. From 1987 to 1991, he traveled in England and the United States. Shivabalayogi's teaching is based on the Vedanta, emphasizing the need for sadhana (spiritual practice) to achieve Self-realization.

Childhood 

Shri Shivabalayogi Maharaj was born Sathyaraju Allaka on January 24, 1935, in the small village of Adivarapupeta in the rice paddy country of the Godavari River delta in the state of Andhra Pradesh, India. The villagers earned a living making cotton saris and dhotis (man's wraps) on handlooms. Sathyaraju's father, Bheemanna, was a weaver; he died before Sathyaraju was three. The young boy was raised in poverty by his mother, Parvatamma, and maternal grandfather, Goli Satham. Sathyaraju was said to be determined and honest.

Initiation in Tapas 

Arou visited the nearby Draksharam temple, where he prayed to Lord Bhimeshwar to grant him peace and the understanding of his relatives for certain actions he felt he had to take.  Eventually a profound change came over him. He became withdrawn and introverted.  His appetite began to shrink and he started to lose interest in other worldly activities.

Sathyaraju claimed to have experienced samadhi (enlightenment) on August 7, 1949 when he was fourteen years old.  He was sitting on the bank of the Godavari irrigation canal just outside the village, eating palmyra fruit that he had divided up between him and his eleven friends. As Shivabalayogi described the incident, he was squeezing the fruit when his body began to tremble with vibrations; a bright light emanated from the fruit in his hands, and he heard the cosmic sound of Aum.  As he watched, a black lingam (symbolizing the absoluteness of the Divinity), about a foot and a half tall, appeared in his hands. The lingam broke in two and a tall, handsome man emerged standing in front of the boy. The man was in the form of a jangama devara, an ascetic who worships and dresses like Lord Shiva. His dark skin appeared smeared with light ash. He wore a white dhoti, a necklace of rudraksha beads, and his matted hair piled on top of his head, in the manner of the yogis of ancient times. He was extremely handsome with large, beautiful eyes. A bright light emanated from him, and all Sathyaraju could see was the yogi and the divine light. The yogi instructed Sathyaraju to sit in a cross-legged position and close his eyes. The yogi touched the boy's forehead at the spiritual third eye (bhrikuti) between the eyebrows, then gently tapped him on top of the head. Sathyaraju immediately passed into samadhi. His friends saw him sitting as if in deep meditation, leading them to think that he was acting. But when they were unable to rouse him from this state, they were afraid Sathyaraju was either possessed by a spirit or dead.

Tapas 

Sathyaraju became known as Adivarapupeta Balayogi, the boy yogi of Adivarapupeta. Many of the villagers believed he was acting, to earn fame and money as a holy man (sadhu). Some abused the boy. The Balayogi was said to have been in samadhi for twenty-three hours a day for eight years.

The Balayogi moved the place of his meditation to a field where the villagers buried children who died young. It was a place the villagers feared at night, so they mostly left the boy alone. There his body suffered from bites, and the skin on his legs began to rot during the rainy season. His body became stiff from the constant meditation until, as Shivabalayogi described, the yogi who had initiated him into tapas, his divine guru, cured all but his hands. He claimed to have mastered meditation in all four cardinal directions (east, north, west and south). Then he claimed his divine guru instructed him to meditate twelve hours a day for another four years to complete a full twelve-year cycle. Through this process, he supposedly achieved nirvikalpa samadhi which is described as follows:

"Thus with all doubts and thoughts extinguished, His mind now absorbed back completely into that Self from whence it had originated, He rested now in that complete Peace beyond all experiences, from which he would no longer go out."

Shivabalayogi defined tapas as continuously meditating for at least twelve hours each day until one attains God realization, Sahaja Samadhi.  Shivabalayogi has clarified that it is the same Atman that manifests either as pure Atman, or appears in the form of the 'Ishta Deva' [God].

Shivabalayogi emerged from his tapas on August 7, 1961, before a crowd of tens of thousands. Using a microphone, he spoke to the crowd and that first public message was broadcast over radio, then printed and circulated on flyers. In his message, he emphasized the importance of proceeding directly to the goal of spirituality, the supreme peace of  Self-realization, and eschewing the temptations and intermediate visions along the way which create more ego and may be nothing but hallucinations of the mind.

Meditation: silent teaching 

From 1963 to 1987, Shivabalayogi traveled extensively throughout India, then Sri Lanka. From 1987 to 1991, he traveled to the U.K., U.S.A., and Italy.  Everywhere he gave public programs consisting of initiation into meditation (dhyana diksha), giving darshan in samadhi, evoking bhava samadhi (sometimes referred to as spiritual ecstasy), particularly during bhajans (kirtan, spiritual music), and distributing vibhuti and prasad as a form of blessing. He taught in silence through the power of his mere presence. He valued knowledge through direct experience far more than words. On one occasion, Shivabalayogi encapsulated his entire teaching in a simple phrase, "Do sadhana."

Shivabalayogi Maharaj encouraged people to meditate for one hour each day. His message was often summarized with the following words: "Know truth through meditation, then you yourself will know who you are, your religion, your purpose in life, and your nature. Do not believe what others say and become a slave to religious prejudices. Meditation is your religion. Meditation is your purpose. Meditation is your path."

Swamiji emphasized that it is not simply by closing one's eyes that one meditates – the mind has to become quiet.  On one occasion, he advised Srinivasa Dikshitar  "If you surrender mentally to your Guru through service, then automatically your mind gets controlled." Later when the same disciple translated to another devotee the word "sadhana" (spiritual practice) as meditation, Shri Shivabalayogi corrected him:

"When I said 'sadhana', why are you using the word 'meditation'?

"Meditation means that a person will be sitting and closing the eyes.  But sadhana can happen through dhyana (meditation), through bhakti (devotion) and through seva (service) and in so many ways when one is able to surrender to the Guru."
The dhyana meditation technique taught by Shri Shivabalayogi is as follows:

Sit, closing the eyes.
Concentrate the mind and sight in between eyebrows.
Do not move your eyeballs or eyelids.
Keep watching there by focusing the attention.
Do not repeat any mantra or name.
Do not imagine anything.
Do not open eyes until the duration of meditation is over.

On other occasions Shivabalayogi did refer to Mantra practices, for example he spoke of hearing the Omkara, the divine sound of Om pervading the universe. He also referred to his use of a Mantra of the sun. The idea was that the whole process would happen spontaneously in the presence of the Guru, and with his blessing. He describes how the crowning accomplishment at the end of tapas was the vision and realisation of the divine form.

Spiritual philosophy: the Yoga Vasistha 

When devotees inquired about Shri Shivabalayogi's spiritual philosophy, Swamiji referred them to the Yoga Vasistha.  "Read the Yoga Vasistha," he would say, "Swamiji’s philosophy is fully expounded in that scripture." The Yoga Vasistha is a dialogue between Sage Vasistha and Sri Rama, in which Vasistha explains that time and space, indeed all visions and thoughts of the mind are, ultimately seen, simply illusions.  The pure consciousness of the Self (Cit-Akasha, the space of Consciousness) is the only reality, eternal, all-pervading and existing in itself.  To escape illusion and experience this One reality, the mind must be brought into a state of perfect control and freedom from distracting thoughts (samadhi).  All that remains is the experience of Supreme Peace, with the potency of all creation.  Swamiji described it as follows:

"He (meaning the jangama devara) asked me to keep watching in between the eyebrows, so I just went on watching.  I saw all the things happening: then all the happenings stopped.  Suddenly I realized that my attention was on 'That' which was making it happen.  Then the attention settled on 'That' which was watching.  Boundless Supreme Peace was there.  Amazing happiness was there.  It was so 'tasty' that one wouldn't ever want to be away from that."

Shri Shivabalayogi's approach is consistent with the Vedanta tradition, and the Yoga Vasistha is considered to be a principal exposition of the advaita vedanta philosophy (of non-dualism).  Swamiji taught that the purpose of life is to attain Self-realization, by performing sadhana (spiritual practice) and overcoming the illusions and imaginations of the mind.  He also taught that meditation can be used to relieve tension and live a peaceful and stress-free life in the world.

Other aspects of Shivabalayogi's mission 

Once he was asked, "What is Swamiji’s teaching?" He simply replied, "Dhyana. Vibhuti. Bhajan. Bhava samadhi." (Meditation. Blessed ash. Spiritual music. Divine ecstasy.)

Swamiji explained that yogis use bhajans to awaken spiritual awareness and prepare students for meditation. Singing songs of devotion to God is an expression of the path of devotion (bhakti). Swamiji once said, "Yogi is love." In the bhakti marga (devotional path), the spiritual seeker focuses their mind entirely on a particular deity or 'Ishta', which is their chosen object of devotion.  Through this practice they supposedly lose the individual ego and gain a larger consciousness. This path is said to be exemplified by Chaitanya Mahaprabhu, Mirabai and Shri Ramakrishna Paramahamsa.

"Bhava" denotes the mood of ecstasy and self-surrender which is induced by the maturing of devotion to one's 'Ishta.' Addressing the understanding of true Bhava Samadhi, Shri Swamiji himself would say, everyone is in some sort of bhava of the guru because of their attachment to the guru. The mind's attachment and devotion is the true bhava. Only when the bhava has fully ripened does the sadhaka (spiritual seeker) experience "bhava samadhi." Spiritually mature sadhakas will usually not exhibit any outward signs which may be indicative of the depth of their experiences.

The outer playful expressions of Bhava that often occurred during bhajans, such as people getting up and dancing, were controversial throughout Shivabalayogi's public programs, and his own statements on the phenomenon appear inconsistent. However, he was intolerant of any public criticism or interference with devotees' bhava experiences. About bhava samadhi, Shri Shivabalayogi once said:

"During this all your bhava (the mind’s feelings) will get concentrated on your favorite deity and thus your mind becomes more concentrated, more single-pointed.  Then meditation itself becomes much easier and consequently one would take up meditation more willingly.
"It's like giving chocolate to a child to make it go to school.  But one should not settle just for the chocolate – one must go on to school.  In the same way, one must meditate."

Shivabalayogi often used the expression the "path of devotion" (bhakti marga) to describe spiritual life. To some devotees he would say:

"You can win over anything with devotion. If God can be won over by devotion, rest assured that anything can be won by devotion. You have to come from devotion to practice meditation. Only then will you get Self realization. You should begin meditation with devotion. Chanting and bhajans are for devotion. They are the start for the spiritual path. Just like you go for the first class in primary school. It’s like that. Prayer, bhajans, homa, japa and all these things help you develop further and further on the spiritual path. Gradually they will bring you into the line of meditation."

When people asked for blessings and healing, Shivabalayogi typically gave them blessed vibhuti (ash), which symbolizes the formless Divine and is meant to encourage faith on the part of the devotee.

Giving prasadam (blessed food) was also very important for him, and devotees often arranged for mass feedings of thousands of people. Shri Swamiji once explained the importance of mass feedings as follows: "Look if you eat at a restaurant then it is simply food.  But when the food is offered to God it becomes prasadam.  During mass feedings if someone contributes even a little food to the occasion, that person’s bhava (the feelings of the mind) will be purified with this thought, 'May my little contribution be helpful in the feeding of the poor and needy.'"

Book 

The spiritual teachings of Sri Sivabala Yogi have been published in the book Laghu Guru Upanishad: Spiritual Teachings of Sri Sivabala Yogi.

Death 

Shri Shivabalayogi Maharaj passed on, or "entered Mahasamadhi", in Kakinada, India, on March 28, 1994. Although it was not evident to onlookers, he had been on dialysis since 1991 and for some fifteen years he suffered from diabetes and an injured foot which became infected and never healed. Throughout this time he worked to inspire people on the spiritual path.

Shivabalayogi often told devotees that yogis do not "die" in the ordinary sense.  They drop their physical bodies through mahasamadhi (the great samadhi), but their presence remains available. "If I am not within the bounds of my body I am more available to you", and he often gave Jesus as an example.

On April 2, 1994, his body was interred at the ashram in Adivarapupeta near the place where he sat for almost ten of his twelve-year tapas. That tomb is now the Adivarapupeta samadhi.

Ashrams 

During Shivabalayogi's three decades of travel, many properties were donated to him in India as ashrams to be held in trust for the public.

The first ashram is in Adivarapupeta, his native village where he completed twelve years of tapas. That is the site of his samādhi, the tomb where his body is buried, and is a pilgrimage site for devotees particularly for Mahashivaratri, the annual festival of Shiva.

In 1963, when Shivabalayogi began traveling in India, a small ashram was established for him in Doddaballapura, a small town north of Bangalore, then the following year in Bangalore on Bannerghatta Road. As he traveled, additional ashrams were established in Sambhar Lake, Dehradun, Hyderabad, Anantapur, Hindupur, and Agra. On August 7, 1977, he established a new ashram in Bangalore at J.P. Nagar, where he later consecrated a temple in honor of the three divine manifestations of God in Hinduism: Brahma and Saraswati the Creator, Vishnu and Lakshmi the Sustainer, and Shiva and Parvati the Destroyers of Illusion. According to one Indian tradition, the worship of Brahma is forbidden, yet Shivabalayogi insisted upon consecrating a deity of the god, thus encouraging people to go beyond blind faith and superstition and to teach that the Divine is only one, but with many names and forms.

Shri Shivabalayogi established charitable trusts in London, Portland, Oregon, and North Carolina. After his death, additional trusts and ashrams have been established in India, the United States, Canada, Malaysia, Singapore, Indonesia and Australia.

Notes

References 
 Shri Shri Shri Shivabalayogi Maharaj: Life & Spiritual Ministration by Lt. Gen. Hanut Singh (India 1980, reprinted India 2008).
 Tapas Shakti by Thomas L. Palotas (India, 1991, ASIN: B0006F1OW2).
 Swamiji's Treasure: God Realization & Experiences of Shivabalayogi by Thomas L. Palotas (Lulu, 2007,).
 Guru-Disciple: The Saga of Sri Sri Sri Shivabalayogi Maharaj and His Legacy by Dr Bruce Young (2009).
 Guru-Shishya: Das Leben von Shri Shri Shri Shivabalayogi Maharaj und Sein Vermächtnis by Dr Bruce Young (Author) and Dr Simon Reitze (Translator) (SRBY UK, 2018).
 Divine Play: the Silent Teaching of Shiva Bala Yogi by Thomas L. Palotas (Lotus Press, 2006).
 Laghu Guru Upanishad – The Spiritual Teachings of Sri Sivabala Yogi by Gurprasad (Partridge India, 2016)

External links 
 

1934 births
1994 deaths
20th-century Hindu religious leaders
Hindu revivalists
Indian Hindu yogis
Indian Hindu monks
Indian Shaivites
People from Vizianagaram
Scholars from Andhra Pradesh
Telugu people
Indian Hindu saints